Stipan is a village in central Croatia, in the municipality of Gvozd, Sisak-Moslavina County. It is connected by the D6 highway.

History

Demographics

According to the 2011 census, the village of Stipan has 50 inhabitants. This represents 21.93% of its pre-war population according to the 1991 census.

Population by ethnicity

Notable natives and residents 
 Nikola Vidović (1917-2000) - antifascist, partisan and People's Hero of Yugoslavia

References 

Populated places in Sisak-Moslavina County
Serb communities in Croatia